Ocnerostoma piniariella is a moth of the family Yponomeutidae. It is found in Europe. The species closely resembles Ocnerostoma friesei.

The wingspan is c. 9 mm. The lanceolate forewings are shining light grey. Hindwings are grey. The larva is shining brown; head and plate of 2 black.

The moth flies in one generation from June to August. .

The larvae feed on Scots pine.

Notes
The flight season refers to Belgium and The Netherlands. This may vary in other parts of the range.

References

External links
 Ocnerostoma piniariella at UK Moths

Moths described in 1847
Yponomeutidae
Moths of Europe